Benedict "Ben" Iroha (born 29 November 1969) is a Nigerian former professional association football player who played as a left-back or left midfielder.

Career
Iroha started his career in Nigeria, scoring the first ever goal in the newly professional Nigerian league in 1990 for Iwuanyanwu Nationale, who went on to win the league that year.

Iroha was originally a midfielder before national coach Clemens Westerhof converted him to play left back. His club career in Europe was largely unsuccessful, and Iroha was allocated to San Jose Clash in 1996. Iroha ended up playing in the inaugural MLS match against D.C. United, and is credited with the league's first-ever assist. The next season, he was traded to D.C. United, where he won the league title but was dropped to comply with salary restrictions. He entered negotiations with the team to re-sign his contract, but they were halted after Iroha was called up to the World Cup squad for Nigeria. After a move to Spanish side Elche CF in 1997, he moved to Watford in December 1998, playing ten games for the Hertfordshire side. A problem with bunions forced him to the sidelines, and he retired in March 2000.

International career
Playing for the Nigerian national team, he has featured in the 1994 FIFA World Cup and the 1998 FIFA World Cup as well as when they won the 1994 African Nations Cup.

Coaching career
After retiring, he returned to the US to coach in the youth department of FC Dallas. Most recently, he was an assistant with the Nigerian U-17 team that won the 2007 FIFA U-17 World Cup and head coach of Nigeria's Dolphins FC. Iroha is on the staff of Heartland of Owerri.

External links

References

1969 births
Living people
People from Aba, Abia
Nigerian footballers
Association football defenders
Nigeria international footballers
Africa Cup of Nations-winning players
1990 African Cup of Nations players
1994 African Cup of Nations players
1994 FIFA World Cup players
1995 King Fahd Cup players
1998 FIFA World Cup players
Eredivisie players
La Liga players
Major League Soccer players
Bendel Insurance F.C. players
Heartland F.C. players
ASEC Mimosas players
SBV Vitesse players
San Jose Earthquakes players
D.C. United players
Elche CF players
Watford F.C. players
Nigerian football managers
Dolphin F.C. (Nigeria) managers
Nigerian expatriate footballers
Nigerian expatriate sportspeople in the Netherlands
Expatriate footballers in the Netherlands
Nigerian expatriate sportspeople in the United States
Expatriate soccer players in the United States
Nigerian expatriate sportspeople in Spain
Expatriate footballers in Spain
Nigerian expatriate sportspeople in England
Expatriate footballers in England
Nigerian expatriate sportspeople in Ivory Coast
Expatriate footballers in Ivory Coast